The Hukanui railway station on the Wairarapa Line was located in the Tararua District of the Manawatū-Whanganui region in New Zealand’s North Island.

The station served the settlement of Hukanui, which was established in 1894, and was briefly called Brownston. The New Zealand Ministry for Culture and Heritage gives a translation of "heavy snow" for Hukanui.

The station opened on 9 October 1896 and closed on 1 August 1988. It became a siding in January 2009.

The  bridge across Mangatainoka River, to the south of Hukanui, is the longest on the line.

References  

Buildings and structures in Manawatū-Whanganui
Rail transport in Manawatū-Whanganui
Tararua District
Defunct railway stations in New Zealand
Railway stations opened in 1896
Railway stations closed in 1988
1896 establishments in New Zealand
1988 disestablishments in New Zealand